Llanelli Rural is a community in the southeast of Carmarthenshire, Wales.

Description
Despite its name, Llanelli Rural covers large parts of the Llanelli urban area, including Bynea, Llwynhendy, Cefncaeau, Pemberton, Bryn, Cwmcarnhywel, Cwmbach, Cynheidre, Penygraig, Penceilogi, Dafen, Felinfoel, Swiss Valley, along with the villages of Pont-Henri, Pontiets, Pwll, and Five Roads, as well as a number of hamlets. The community surrounds Llanelli, except at the coast.

According to the 2001 census it had a population of 21,043, increasing to 22,800 at the 2011 Census.

Llanelli Rural is bordered by the communities of: Llanelli; Pembrey and Burry Port Town; Trimsaran; Llangyndeyrn; Pontyberem; Llannon; and Llangennech, all being in Carmarthenshire; and by: Gorseinon; Llwchwr; Gowerton; Llanrhidian Higher; and Llanrhidian Lower, all being in the City and County of Swansea.

Llanelli Rural Council
Llanelli Rural Community Council governs the area at a community level. The council headquarters is located in Llanelli town centre.

In 2013/14 Llanelli Rural Council received £959,530 via the council tax precept, the highest of any community council in Wales.

Current composition

Following the last full election on 4 May 2017 the council composition was:

The council elected Cllr. Tegwen Devichand as leader and Cllr. Steve Donoghue as deputy leader. Cllr. Devichand pledged to continue to cooperate with Llanelli Town Council and the Carmarthenshire County Council, on a number of projects.

Election history

2017 election

2021 By-elections
Councillors Mina Najmi and Ella Simmons left the council in 2020, leading to a by-election for their Pemberton ward seats on 6 May 2021. The by-election saw Christopher Beer (Labour) and Samantha Nurse (Independent) elected.

Following the death of Carol Rees in 2021, Alexander Evans (originally independent but joined Plaid Cymru soon after) was co-opted to serve as a member for the Glyn ward.

Although originally elected under a Labour ticket, Sharen Davies and Jason Hart left the party and became independent members in 2018 and 2021 respectively. Jordan Randall was originally elected as a Plaid Cymru candidate but moved to the Conservative party.

2022 election

Chairs of Council

2022/23 Gyles Morgan
2021/22 Tegwen Devichand
2019/21 Sharen Davies
2018/19 Sian Caiach
2017/18 John Evans
2016/17 Stephen M Donoghue 
2015/16 Martin Davies
2014/15 Lindy J Butler
2013/14 Thomas J Jones
2012/13 Tegwen Devichand
2011/12 Susan Lewis
2010/11 Sharen Davies

References

External links
Llanelli Rural Council
Llanelli Rural Council Training

Communities in Carmarthenshire